Clark Van Galder (February 6, 1909 – November 16, 1965) was an American football, basketball player, track athlete, and coach.  He served as the head football coach at La Crosse State Teachers, now University of Wisconsin–La Crosse, from 1948 to 1951 and at Fresno State College, now California State University, Fresno, from 1952 to 1958, compiling  a career college football record of 77–27–3.  Van Galder died on November 16, 1965 after collapsing at a banquet in Madison, Wisconsin.  He had five sons, the fourth of which, Tim, played football as a quarterback at Iowa State University and then in the National Football League (NFL) with the New York Jets and St. Louis Cardinals.

Head coaching record

College football

References

External links
 

1909 births
1965 deaths
American men's basketball players
Basketball coaches from Wisconsin
Basketball players from Wisconsin
Fresno State Bulldogs football coaches
Fresno State Bulldogs men's basketball coaches
Wisconsin Badgers football coaches
Wisconsin–La Crosse Eagles football coaches
Wisconsin–La Crosse Eagles football players
Wisconsin–La Crosse Eagles men's basketball players
College men's track and field athletes in the United States
College track and field coaches in the United States
High school basketball coaches in Wisconsin
High school football coaches in Wisconsin
Sportspeople from Janesville, Wisconsin
Players of American football from Wisconsin